Qntal II is the second album of the German Darkwave/Gothic Rock/Industrial band Qntal, released in 1995. It features lyrics by Walther von der Vogelweide and other medieval songs combined with modern electronic sound.

The album was re-released by Noir Records in 2007.

Track listing

References
[ Qntal II] at Allmusic.com

1995 albums
Dark wave albums